Westphalia Township is a township in Anderson County, Kansas, United States. As of the 2010 census, its population was 372.

Geography
According to the USGS, it contains one cemetery, Saint Teresa.

The stream of Cherry Creek runs through this township.

References
 USGS Geographic Names Information System (GNIS)

External links
 City-Data.com

Townships in Anderson County, Kansas
Townships in Kansas